American rapper Afroman has released 18 studio albums, one live album, 13 mixtapes, four extended plays (EPs) and three singles.

Albums

Studio albums

Live albums

Mixtapes

Extended plays

Singles

Music videos

References

Hip hop discographies
Discographies of American artists